Westsound Seaplane Base (SPB)  is a seaplane base located adjacent to West Sound on Orcas Island in San Juan County, Washington, United States. It is owned by the Westsound Marina.

Facilities 
Westsound Seaplane Base has two seaplane landing areas: 10/28 is 4,000 by 500 feet (1,219 x 152 m) and 18/36 is 5,000 by 500 feet (1,524 x 152 m).

Airlines and destinations

References

External links 
 Aerial photo from USGS The National Map

Airports in Washington (state)
Airports in San Juan County, Washington
Seaplane bases in the United States